Fenarimol, sold under the tradenames Bloc, Rimidin and Rubigan, is a fungicide which acts against rusts, blackspot and mildew fungi. It is used on ornamental plants, trees, lawns, tomatoes, peppers, eggplants, cucumbers and melons. It is mainly used to control powdery mildew. It works by inhibiting the fungus's biosynthesis of important steroid molecules (via blockade of the CYP51 enzyme).

History

Fenarimol was developed by Eli Lilly & Company around 1971.

As of early 2018, derivatives of this compound are being researched in an open source manner for possible treatment of eumycetoma.

Synthesis
Fenarimol is made by the reaction of 2,4'-dichlorobenzophenone with an organolithium pyrimidine made via bromine-lithium exchange.

References

External links
 

Aromatase inhibitors
Chloroarenes
Endocrine disruptors
Fungicides
Nonsteroidal antiandrogens
Pyrimidines
Xenoestrogens